An ocean current is a continuous, directed movement of seawater generated by a number of forces acting upon the water, including wind, the Coriolis effect, breaking waves, cabbeling, and temperature and salinity differences. Depth contours, shoreline configurations, and interactions with other currents influence a current's direction and strength. Ocean currents are primarily horizontal water movements.

An ocean current flows for great distances and together they create the global conveyor belt, which plays a dominant role in determining the climate of many of Earth's regions. More specifically, ocean currents influence the temperature of the regions through which they travel.  For example, warm currents traveling along more temperate coasts increase the temperature of the area by warming the sea breezes that blow over them.  Perhaps the most striking example is the Gulf Stream, which makes northwest Europe much more temperate for its high latitude than other areas at the same latitude. Another example is Lima, Peru, whose cooler subtropical climate contrasts with that of its surrounding tropical latitudes because of the Humboldt Current. Ocean currents are patterns of water movement that influence climate zones and weather patterns around the world. They are primarily driven by winds and by seawater density, although many other factors – including the shape and configuration of the ocean basin they flow through – influence them. The two basic types of currents – surface and deep-water currents – help define the character and flow of ocean waters across the planet.

Causes 

Ocean dynamics define and describe the motion of water within the oceans. Ocean temperature and motion fields can be separated into three distinct layers: mixed (surface) layer, upper ocean (above the thermocline), and deep ocean.

Surface ocean currents (in contrast to subsurface ocean currents), make up only 8% of all water in the ocean, are generally restricted to the upper  of ocean water, and are separated from lower regions by varying temperatures and salinity which affect the density of the water, which in turn, defines each oceanic region. Because the movement of deep water in ocean basins is caused by density-driven forces and gravity, deep waters sink into deep ocean basins at high latitudes where the temperatures are cold enough to cause the density to increase.
Surface currents are measued in units of meters per second (m/s) or in knots.

Wind-driven circulation 
Surface oceanic currents are driven by wind currents, the large scale prevailing winds drive major persistent ocean currents, and seasonal or occasional winds drive currents of similar persistence to the winds that drive them, and the Coriolis effect plays a major role in their development. The Ekman spiral velocity distribution results in the currents flowing at an angle to the driving winds, and they develop typical clockwise spirals in the northern hemisphere and counter-clockwise rotation in the southern hemisphere.
In addition, the areas of surface ocean currents move somewhat with the seasons; this is most notable in equatorial currents.

Deep ocean basins generally have a non-symmetric surface current, in that the eastern equator-ward flowing branch is broad and diffuse whereas the pole-ward flowing western boundary current is relatively narrow.

Thermohaline circulation 

Deep ocean currents are driven by density and temperature gradients. This thermohaline circulation is also known as the ocean's conveyor belt. These currents, sometimes called submarine rivers, flow deep below the surface of the ocean and are hidden from immediate detection. Where significant vertical movement of ocean currents is observed, this is known as upwelling and downwelling.  Deep ocean currents are currently being researched using a fleet of underwater robots called Argo.

The thermohaline circulation is a part of the large-scale ocean circulation that is driven by global density gradients created by surface heat and freshwater fluxes. The adjective thermohaline derives from thermo- referring to temperature and  referring to salt content, factors which together determine the density of sea water. Wind-driven surface currents (such as the Gulf Stream) travel polewards from the equatorial Atlantic Ocean, cooling en route, and eventually sinking at high latitudes (forming North Atlantic Deep Water). This dense water then flows into the ocean basins. While the bulk of it upwells in the Southern Ocean, the oldest waters (with a transit time of around 1000 years) upwell in the North Pacific. Extensive mixing therefore takes place between the ocean basins, reducing differences between them and making the Earth's oceans a global system. On their journey, the water masses transport both energy (in the form of heat) and matter (solids, dissolved substances and gases) around the globe. As such, the state of the circulation has a large impact on the climate of the Earth. The thermohaline circulation is sometimes called the ocean conveyor belt, the great ocean conveyor, or the global conveyor belt. On occasion, it is imprecisely used to refer to the meridional overturning circulation, (MOC).

Distribution 

Currents of the Arctic Ocean
 
 
 
 
 
 
 
 
 
 

Currents of the Atlantic Ocean
 
 
 
 
 
 
 
 
 
 
 
 
 
 
 
 
 
 
 
 
 
 
 
 
 
 
 
 
 

Currents of the Indian Ocean
 
 
 
 
 
 
 
 
 
 
 
 
 
 

Currents of the Pacific Ocean
 
 
 
 
 
 
 
 
 
 
 
 
 
 
 
 
 
 
 
 
 
 
 

Currents of the Southern Ocean
 
 
 

Oceanic gyres

Effects on climate and ecology 
Ocean currents are important in the study of marine debris, and vice versa. These currents also affect temperatures throughout the world. For example, the ocean current that brings warm water up the north Atlantic to northwest Europe also cumulatively and slowly blocks ice from forming along the seashores, which would also block ships from entering and exiting inland waterways and seaports, hence ocean currents play a decisive role in influencing the climates of regions through which they flow. Cold ocean water currents flowing from polar and sub-polar regions bring in a lot of plankton that are crucial to the continued survival of several key sea creature species in marine ecosystems. Since plankton are the food of fish, abundant fish populations often live where these currents prevail.

Ocean currents are also very important in the dispersal of many life forms. An example is the life-cycle of the European Eel.

Economic importance 
Knowledge of  surface ocean currents is essential in reducing costs of shipping, since traveling with them reduces fuel costs. In the wind powered sailing-ship era, knowledge of wind patterns and ocean currents was even more essential. A good example of this is the Agulhas Current (down along eastern Africa), which long prevented sailors from reaching India. In recent times, around-the-world sailing competitors make good use of surface currents to build and maintain speed.
Ocean currents can also be used for marine power generation, with areas  of Japan, Florida and Hawaii being considered for test projects.

See also

References

Further reading

External links 

 Current global map of sea surface currents

 
Oceanographical terminology
Physical oceanography
Articles containing video clips